Another You is a 1991 American comedy film directed by Maurice Phillips and produced and written by Ziggy Steinberg. The film stars Richard Pryor, Gene Wilder, Mercedes Ruehl, Vanessa Williams and Kevin Pollak. The film was released in the United States on July 26, 1991.

The film, a critical and box office failure, was the fourth and final film Pryor and Wilder starred in together beginning with Silver Streak in 1976. Another You  was the last film in which both actors' played a leading role, as well as the final appearance of Wilder in a theatrical film.

Plot
George (Gene Wilder), a former mental patient and pathological liar, is released from the hospital. He is quickly, purposefully mistaken for millionaire brewery heir Abe Fielding by a troupe of actors hired by Rupert Dibbs (Stephen Lang), an unscrupulous business manager. Rupert needs George to believe he is Fielding in order to kill him off and inherit the Fielding Brewery and family fortune.

Eddie Dash (Richard Pryor), a con man, tenuously befriends George due to a community service assignment. He attempts at first to capitalize on George's mistaken identity, but after being pressured by Rupert into killing George for profit, turns the tables on Rupert and helps George fake his death, only to come back to the land of the living and inheriting both the brewery and the Fielding fortune instead.

Along the way, Eddie and George turn two of Rupert's female associates into allies and partners, while getting themselves into plenty of comical chaos.

Cast
 Richard Pryor as Eddie Dash
 Gene Wilder as George/Abe Fielding
 Mercedes Ruehl as Elaine
 Stephen Lang as Rupert Dibbs
 Vanessa Williams as Gloria
 Vincent Schiavelli as Dentist
 Craig Richard Nelson as Walt
 Kevin Pollak as Phil
 Phil Rubenstein as Al

Production
The film was released five years after Pryor revealed that he had been diagnosed with multiple sclerosis in 1986, and his physical deterioration is evident in this film. Pryor later said he "got personally and professionally fucked on that film. They fired the director and hired another ego. I was told I wasn't going to have to reshoot scenes but the new ego had me do it anyway. That's when I discovered things weren't going well for me professionally."

Peter Bogdanovich was the original director, but he was replaced after five weeks of shooting in New York; On the last night of location filming, Peter Bogdanovich received a phone call from his agent around midnight, letting him know he was being replaced as director. After reviewing footage with the replacement director, it was determined that none of the New York footage was usable and the script was rewritten to be shot entirely in Los Angeles. The movie was shot and completed in LA, and none of Bogdanovich's footage was used.

On Gilbert Gottfried's podcast (Gilbert Gottfried's Amazing Colossal Podcast!) in 2016, Bogdanovich describes how he and Gene Wilder didn't get along because Bogdanovich devoted most of his time and energy to Richard Pryor, due to his health issues. Though Bogdanovich claims the film had only been green-lit because he had got Pryor involved in the first place (the studio apparently did not want Wilder to star alone), he believes it was Wilder who successfully campaigned to have him replaced with another director. Gottfried himself was cast in the Bogdanovich version of Another You, but he was dropped from the film when it was reshot.

Reception
Another You was a box office failure. It ranks among the top ten widely released films for having the biggest second weekend drop at the box office, dropping 78.1% from $1,537,965 to $334,836. The film has a 5% rating on Rotten Tomatoes, based on 21 reviews. The consensus summarizes: "So stubbornly unfunny that not even a reunited Richard Pryor and Gene Wilder are enough to give it a spark, Another You is worse than none at all." Audiences surveyed by CinemaScore gave the film a grade of "C" on scale of A+ to F.

Stephen Holden of The New York Times called the film "a frantically incoherent comedy" with a screenplay that "jabbers along in ways that even Mr. Wilder, who carries the brunt of the dialogue, cannot make amusing. Mr. Pryor's role is paltry and his dialogue scant. When all else fails, he is reduced to repeating obscenities." Joseph McBride of Variety wrote that "producer Ziggy Steinberg's feeble script is given slapdash direction by the man who replaced Peter Bogdanovich on what is billed 'a film by Maurice Phillips' (the best joke in the film)... Though Pryor shows old flashes of his old comic brilliance and charm, it's painful to see how his health problems have affected him in this role." Michael Wilmington of the Los Angeles Times wrote, "Producer-writer Ziggy Steinberg's script is like a stone tied around the movie's neck that sinks it, despite all those gaudy, glossy balloons pulling it up." Gene Siskel of the Chicago Tribune gave the film half of one star out of four, calling it a "completely worthless comedy" with "no laughs."

References

External links

 
 
 

1991 films
1991 comedy films
1990s American films
1990s buddy comedy films
1990s crime comedy films
1990s English-language films
American buddy comedy films
American crime comedy films
Films about actors
Films about con artists
Films about identity theft
Films set in California
Films set in Los Angeles
TriStar Pictures films